The following is an incomplete list of festivals in Oceania, with links to separate lists by country and region where applicable. This list includes festivals of diverse types, including regional festivals, commerce festivals, film festivals, folk festivals, carnivals, pow wows, recurring festivals on holidays, and music festivals. Music festivals are annotated "(music)" for countries where there is not a dedicated music section.

The list overlaps with List of film festivals in Oceania.

Sovereign states

Australia 

List of festivals in Australia
List of music festivals in Australia

Fiji

List of festivals in Fiji

Kiribati
Public holidays in Kiribati

The Marshall Islands 
Public holidays in the Marshall Islands

Federated States of Micronesia
Public holidays in the Federated States of Micronesia
Yap Day
 Homecoming Summer Festival
 Canoe Festival

Nauru
Public holidays in Nauru

New Zealand

Palau

Festival of Pacific Arts
Public holidays in Palau

Papua New Guinea
 
Malagan
Goroka Show (music)
Sing-sing (New Guinea) (music)

Samoa

Festival of Pacific Arts
 Public holidays in Samoa

Solomon Islands

Festival of Pacific Arts
Public holidays in the Solomon Islands

Tonga
List of festivals in Tonga

Tuvalu
Public holidays in Tuvalu

Vanuatu
Public holidays in Vanuatu

Associated states of New Zealand

Cook Islands

Festival of Pacific Arts
Public holidays in the Cook Islands

Niue

Dependencies and other territories

American Samoa

Festival of Pacific Arts

Christmas Island
Public holidays in Christmas Island

Cocos (Keeling) Islands

Easter Island

French Polynesia

Festival of Pacific Arts
FIFO (Festival International du Film Documentaire Océanien) in Tahiti

Guam

Festival of Pacific Arts
Public holidays in Guam

Hawaii
  
Aloha Festivals
Festival of Lights (Hawaii)
First Hawaiian International Auto Show
Iolani Luahine Hula Festival
Kawaii Kon
Lei Day
Merrie Monarch Festival
Spam Jam
World Invitational Hula Festival
Molokai Ka Hula Piko
Rainbow Film Festival (film)
Maui Film Festival (film)
Hawaii International Film Festival (film)
Music festivals in Hawaii
 
List of music festivals and venues in Hawaii
Annual Ukulele Festival

New Caledonia

Festival of Pacific Arts

Norfolk Island
Public holidays in Norfolk Island

Northern Mariana Islands

Pitcairn Islands

Tokelau
Public holidays in Tokelau

Wallis and Futuna

See also

List of festivals
List of film festivals
List of music festivals

References

External links

Region topic template using suffix
 
₵Oceania